Inga Zurabovna Gurgenidze (Georgian: ინგა ზურაბის ასული გურგენიძე, ; born 23 April 2009), born Inga Zurabovna Nikitina, is a Russian-Georgian figure skater who represents Georgia in women's singles. She is the 2022 JGP Italy bronze medalist, the 2022 Denis Ten Memorial junior champion, the 2022 Bosphorus Cup junior silver medalist, and the 2023 Dragon Trophy junior champion. She finished within the top ten at the 2023 World Junior Championships. She is the twenty-third woman in history to have successfully landed a triple Axel jump in competition.

Personal life 
Gurgenidze was born on 23 April 2009 in Kazan, Tatarstan, Russia. She competed under her mother's surname (Nikitina) until the 2021–22 season when she changed it to her father's surname (Gurgenidze) and confirmed that she would be representing Georgia in international competition.

Programs

Competitive highlights 
JGP: Junior Grand Prix

For Georgia

For Russia

Detailed results 

Personal best highlighted in bold.

For Georgia

References

External links 
 

2009 births
Living people
Sportspeople from Kazan
Russian female single skaters
Female single skaters from Georgia (country)
Russian emigrants to Georgia (country)